Velaiilla Pattadhari is a 2014 Indian Tamil-language comedy drama film written and filmed by Velraj while also making his directorial debut. The film featured Dhanush, who produced the film under his production company Wunderbar Films, and Amala Paul in the lead roles. Saranya Ponvannan, Samuthirakani, Vivek, Surbhi and Amitash Pradhan played supporting roles. The film's story focuses on Raghuvaran (Dhanush), a civil engineering graduate who is unemployed for four years, and his search for a job. As soon as he finds employment, he faces competition from Arun Subramaniam (Amitash), the head of a rival engineering company, for a government project contract. The rest of the film shows how Raghuvaran overcomes the obstacles set by Arun. The soundtrack and score were composed by Anirudh Ravichander while the editing was handled by M. V. Rajesh Kumar.

Produced on a budget of ₹80 million, Velaiilla Pattadhari was released on 18 July 2014 and received positive reviews. It was commercially successful, grossing ₹530 million worldwide. The film won 19 awards from 31 nominations; its direction, performances of the cast members and music have received the most attention from award groups.

At the 62nd Filmfare Awards South, Velaiilla Pattadhari was nominated in seven categories, winning Best Actor (Dhanush) and Best Music Director (Ravichander). At the 9th Vijay Awards, it received seven nominations and won five awards, Best Film, Best Actor, Best Actress, Best Music Director, and Favourite Song. It garnered eleven nominations at the 4th South Indian International Movie Awards ceremony and won seven awards, including Best Actor, Best Actor in a Supporting Role (Female) for Saranya, Best Comedian for Vivek and Best Debutant Director for Velraj. Among other wins, the film received two Ananda Vikatan Cinema Awards and Edison Awards each. It also received two nominations for Best Actor and Best Supporting Actress for Dhanush and Saranya respectively at the Norway Tamil Film Festival Awards, winning none. The film won Velraj the Best Dialogue Writer at the Tamil Nadu State Film Awards.

Awards and nominations

See also 
 List of Tamil films of 2014

Notes

References

External links 
 Accolades for Velaiilla Pattadhari at the Internet Movie Database

Velaiilla Pattadhari